Tate Peak is a sharp peak, 1,885 m, standing 2 nautical miles (3.7 km) east of Escalade Peak at the south side of Skelton Neve in the Van Allen Range. Named by Advisory Committee on Antarctic Names (US-ACAN) in 1964 for Lieutenant T.N. Tate, U.S. Navy, public works officer at McMurdo Station, 1963.

Mountains of Oates Land